Nick Zhang ( (Zhāng Xiǎodōng); born 30 August 1963) is CEO of Wuzhen Institute and a writer. In 2017, his book A Brief History of Artificial Intelligence was awarded Top 10 Books of Southern Metropolis Daily. In 2018, he won Wu Wenjun Artificial Intelligence Science and Technology Award.

Education 
Zhang graduated from Tianjing University in 1985, Chinese Academy of Sciences in 1988, and University of Massachusetts at Amherst in 1992.

Career 
Zhang worked at Harvard and HP in his early years. He moved to Silicon Valley in the mid 1990s. In 2010, he invested and helped startups in internet and artificial intelligence area. He has been partner at VC firms. He founded Wuzhen Institute in 2016 in Wuzhen, near Shanghai.

Works

References 

1963 births
Living people
American computer businesspeople
American computer scientists
Technology writers
University of Massachusetts Amherst alumni
Philosophy writers
Artificial intelligence researchers